HMS Princess of Orange was launched in 1796 by the Amsterdam department of the Dutch Navy. In 1799 the British Royal Navy captured her during the Vlieter incident. From 1800 to 1811 she served on the North Sea, Channel, and Irish stations frequently serving as a flagship for various British admirals. Between 1811 and 1820 she served as a powder hulk; she was sold for breaking up in 1822.


Royal Navy service
Captain G. Hope commissioned Princess of Orange in August 1800.

On 30 November he sailed her from Sheerness to Yarmouth to remain with the North Sea fleet. From January 1801 she was the flagship of Admiral Archibald Dickson. At the end of April 1802, upon the implementation of the Treaty of Amiens, Princess of Orange sailed up the Thames to Chatham where she was paid off. By June she was in Ordinary.

In May 1803, following the resumption of war with France, Captain Charles Cunningham commissioned Princess of Orange, and soon after assumed the command of a squadron sent to watch the Dutch fleet in the Texel.

In September 1803 Captain Thomas Rogers replaced Cunningham, with Princess of Orange being assigned to the North Sea station. She then served in the squadron blockading the Texel, though she made voyages back to Yarmouth for supplies.

Princess of Orange, Africiane, the hired armed cutter Swift, and the hired armed lugger Agnes, shared in the proceeds of the capture of Upstalsboom, H.L. De Haase, master, on 11 November 1804.

In September 1804 Princess of Orange was at Sheerness having her damaged rudder repaired; on 21 September she returned to the Texel. On 27 November she arrived at Portsmouth where Admiral William O'Brien Drury joined her, he having been appointed second-in-command of the Irish station. She sailed on 24 December and by 30 December was in Bantry Bay. In early 1805 Princess of Orange transferred to the Channel fleet. On 6 August she arrived at the Downs from Plymouth, and then went on to Yarmouth. She briefly again blockaded the Texel, before returning to Sheerness on 2 September. Instead, with the Trafalgar campaign under way, she joined the North Sea squadron under Rear-Admiral Thomas Macnamara Russell.

Princess of Orange was among the vessels that shared in the proceeds of the detention on 21 October r1805 of '"Anna Wilhelmina.Princess of Orange returned to Sheerness at the end of January 1806 and was paid off in February.

Captain Joshua Sidney Horton commissioned Princess of Orange in June 1806, for the Downs. She then became the flagship for Vice Admiral John Holloway.

On  28 August 1807 the boats of Princess of Orange, and  detained the Dutch vessels Eos and Amicitia. Consequently all three vessels shared in the proceeds of the prize-taking.

In 1807 Princess of Orange became flagship to Admiral Bartholomew Samuel Rowley.

Then on 13 October 1807 Commander Francis Beauman received promotion to post captain and took command of Prince of Orange. From February 1808 to March 1811, Princess of Orange was flagship to Admiral Sir Gorge Campbell, first on the Downs station (1808), and then the Baltic station (1809–1810).Princess of Orange'' was paid off in June 1811. From then until 1820 she served as a powder hulk in the Medway.

Fate
The "Principal Officers and Commissioners of His Majesty's Navy", offered "Princess  of Orange, of 74  guns and 1565 tons", "lying at Chatham" for sale on 13 April 1822. She was sold five days later for breaking up.

Notes

Citations

References
 
 
  Unpublished manuscript
 

1796 ships
Captured ships
Ships of the line of the Royal Navy